Xu Kai (born 5 March 1995), also known by his English name Kai Xu, is a Chinese actor and model. His most notable roles include the dramas Story of Yanxi Palace (2018), The Legends (2019), Arsenal Military Academy (2019), Falling Into Your Smile (2021), Royal Feast (2022), She and her Perfect Husband (2022).

Biography

Beginnings
In 2013, Xu won the championship in a print ads modeling contests held in Guangzhou. In 2016, he signed a contract with Huanyu Film, an entertainment company owned by Yu Zheng, and entered the entertainment industry. He was cast in his first television series Zhaoge, where he played Yang Jian.

2018–present: Rising popularity
In 2018, Xu starred in the historical romance drama Untouchable Lovers, followed by palace drama Story of Yanxi Palace, where he gained mainstream recognition with his role as Fucha Fuheng.

In 2019, Xu made his big-screen debut in the romance film Autumn Fairy Tale. The same year, Xu played his first lead role in xianxia drama The Legends. Xu's role as a loyal and reticent demon prince in The Legends received positive reviews, and he experienced a rise in popularity. The same year, he starred in the youth military drama Arsenal Military Academy. His performance in the drama earned him the Best Actor award at the Hengdian Film and TV Festival of China. Xu also starred in the xianxia drama Once Upon a Time in Lingjian Mountain, based on the manhua Congqian Youzuo Lingjianshan. Forbes China listed Xu under their 30 Under 30 China 2019 list which consisted of 30 influential people under 30 years old who have had a substantial effect in their fields.

In 2020, Xu starred in the historical fantasy drama Dance of the Sky Empire.

In 2021, Xu Kai starred in the Chinese e-sport romance comedy television series Falling Into Your Smile as Lu Si Cheng or Chessman, and in the Chinese Xianxia fantasy romance television series Ancient Love Poetry as Bai Jue / Qing Mu / Bo Xuan.

In 2022, Xu lead in the historical fiction drama Royal Feast, followed by the drama Lost in the Kunlun Mountains, and a modern drama 'She and Her Perfect Husband', that began airing from 14 November 2022.

Kai began filming for his upcoming modern drama titled 'As Beautiful As You' on 5 February 2023. The drama is based on the Chinese novel 'As Beautiful as Beijing ' by author Jiu Yue Xi.

Filmography

Film

Television series

Discography

Awards and nominations

References

www.cpophome.com/xu-kai-and-cheng-xiao-relationship/ 
https://vk.com/wall-168810447_2063
https://inf.news/en/entertainment/0499977d3e118509793c2ce6ca97124c.html

1995 births
Living people
Chinese male television actors
Male actors from Guangdong
21st-century Chinese male actors